Raymond Tatafu (born 14 February 1995) is a New Zealand rugby union player who plays for Counties Manukau in the National Provincial Championship. His playing position is lock.

Born in Tonga, he moved to New Zealand with his family at the age of 14.

Reference list

External links
itsrugby.co.uk profile

1995 births
New Zealand rugby union players
Living people
Rugby union locks
Tongan emigrants to New Zealand
Tongan rugby union players
Southland rugby union players
Counties Manukau rugby union players
Kyuden Voltex players